John William Gladwin (born 7 May 1963) is a male English former middle-distance runner and athletics administrator.

Athletics career
Gladwin won a silver medal representing England in the 1500 metres at the 1986 Commonwealth Games in Edinburgh, Scotland. He also won the 800 metres (1987) and 1500 metres (1983) titles at the UK Championships and the 1500 metres at the 1986 AAAs Championships.

His track mile time of 3:51.02 is the 9th fastest of all time by a British athlete.

In 2019 Gladwin was elected president of Belgrave Harriers, the club he competed for as an athlete. He still holds Belgrave club records in the 800m, 1,000m, 1500m and the mile.

International competitions

References

External links

1963 births
English male middle-distance runners
Living people
Commonwealth Games medallists in athletics
Commonwealth Games silver medallists for England
Athletes (track and field) at the 1986 Commonwealth Games
Medallists at the 1986 Commonwealth Games